Brothers-Valleys were a rugby league team formed from a merger between the Brothers and Fortitude Valley Diehards teams in 2002. The team debuted in a pre-season match against St George-Illawarra in 2002, and for the next two seasons competed in the Brisbane A Grade Mixwell Cup and Mixwell Colts competitions, playing out of Perry Park in Mayne, Brisbane. In 2004 they moved to O'Callaghan Park in Zillmere and were accepted into the Queensland Cup, but in a year of poor performances both on and off the field they failed to win a single game and only managed a draw against the Souths Logan Magpies.

On 22 November 2004 the Queensland Rugby League announced that:
The only club not participating in 2005 will be Brothers Valleys Diehards. While the QRL acknowledges the rich history associated with the organisation, the club’s inability to meet specified guidelines has resulted in this situation. Avenues remain open for the club to apply to be part of lower grade competitions in the South East Division.

Results

Queensland Cup
 2004: 12th

See also

References

External links
 QRL Brothers-Valleys page

Rugby clubs established in 2002
Rugby clubs disestablished in 2004
Rugby league teams in Brisbane
Defunct rugby league teams in Australia
Irish-Australian culture
2002 establishments in Australia
2004 disestablishments in Australia